Lazarev (masculine) or Lazareva (feminine) may refer to:

Places 
Lazarev (urban-type settlement), an urban-type settlement in Khabarovsk Krai, Russia
Lazarev Bay in Antarctica
Lazarev Ice Shelf in Antarctica
Lazarev Mountains
Lazarev Sea in Antarctica
Lazarev Trough in Antarctica
Cape Lazarev (disambiguation)
 Lazarev atoll
 Lazarev Island
Lazareva Pećina, a cave in Serbia
Wonsan, a city in North  Korea formerly known as Port Lazarev

Ships
Russian battlecruiser Admiral Lazarev
Admiral Lazarev-class monitor
Admiral Lazarev, a former name of the Krasny Kavkaz cruiser

Others
Lazarev (surname) (Lazareva)
Lazarev Institute of Oriental Languages in Moscow, Russia
 Port Lazarev

See also
 Lazareff (disambiguation)
 Lazareva Subota, Orthodox tradition
 Lazarevski, surname
 Lazarevsky, several inhabited localities in Russia